DYAP (88.3 FM), broadcasting as 88.3 XFM, is a radio station owned by Southern Broadcasting Network and operated by Y2H Broadcasting Network, Inc. The station's studio is located at Unit 5, 2nd floor, Z Plaza Bldg., Dionisio Jakosalem St., Brgy. Zapatera, Cebu City, while its transmitter is located at the SBN Compound, San Carlos Heights, Quiot Pardo, Cebu City.

History
 The station began its broadcast in 1988 as DYAP 88.3.
 In 2001, it rebranded as First FM 88.3 with an Adult Top 40 format.
 In late 2003, the station became as Mom's Radio 88.3. Dedicated to the mothers and mother-to-be listeners in Cebu City. It transferred its studio to Krizia Bldg. along Gorordo Ave.
 In 2010, it reverted to DYAP 88.3 with limited broadcast time from 12:00 NN to 8:00 PM. It relocated to its transmitter site in San Carlos Heights.
 In November 2015, Mom's Radio returned on air, this time via satellite from Manila. It operated daily from 6:00 AM to 10:00 PM.
 On February 25, 2018, Mom's Radio stations went off the air due to financial constraints.
 In September 2022, Yes2Health took over the station's operations and rebranded it as XFM with a news and music format. It began test broadcast on January 26, 2023, along with a newly installed 10,000-watt transmitter from DB Elettronica of Italy for better signal reception in Metro Cebu.
 On February 13, 2023, XFM Cebu debuted its own slate of local programming.
 On March 20, 2023, XFM Cebu was officially launched with a motorcade and a free concert at the Brgy. Cogon Ramos Gymnasium, featuring performances from Jay-R Siaboc and Rommel Tuico.

References 

Southern Broadcasting Network
Radio stations in Metro Cebu
Radio stations established in 1988
Defunct radio stations in the Philippines